Naval War College may refer to:

 Naval War College, United States
 Naval War College, Goa, India
 Naval War College (Japan)
 Naval War College (South Korea)
 Pakistan Naval War College
 Royal Naval War College